Eugene Cullen Kennedy (August 28, 1928 – June 3, 2015) was a psychologist, writer, columnist, and professor emeritus of Loyola University Chicago. Kennedy was a laicized Catholic priest and a long-time observer of the Catholic Church,  but his work spans many genres. He published over 50 books, including two biographies, three novels, and a play, as well as books on psychology, the Roman Catholic Church, and the relationship between psychology and religion. In the early 1970s, inspired by Vatican II, he emerged as a voice for reform and modernization of the Roman Catholic Church.

Early life and education 

Eugene Cullen Kennedy was born in Syracuse, New York, on August 28, 1928, to second-generation Irish parents, James Donald Kennedy and Gertrude Veronica Cullen.  His father was an executive with the King Kullen Grocery Company, the family-owned supermarket chain founded by Kennedy's uncle, Michael J. Cullen, and his mother was a homemaker. During the 1980s, Kennedy became a consultant to King Kullen and a member of its board of directors, positions he held until his death.

Raised in Long Island, Kennedy graduated from Chaminade High School in Mineola, NY, in 1946, then entered the Maryknoll Seminary in Maryknoll, NY.  From that institution, Kennedy received a B.A. (1950), S.T.B (1953) and M.R.E. (1954). Following his ordination to the priesthood on June 11, 1955, he was instructor in psychology at the Maryknoll Seminary in Clarks Summit, PA, before beginning graduate studies in psychology at the Catholic University of America, where he obtained an MA (1958) and a PhD (1962).

Career 

Kennedy was a licensed psychologist in Illinois, and professor of psychology and counselor at Maryknoll College, Glen Ellyn, Illinois, from 1960 until 1971. He was Professor of Psychology at Loyola University of Chicago from 1969 until his retirement in 1995, when he became Professor Emeritus. He was a Fellow of the American Psychological Association and served as President of Division 36 (1975-1976) where he led a resurgence of the phenomenologically based research into religion.

Kennedy first gained attention among Catholic readers in 1965 with the publication of his first book, The Genius of the Apostolate, which he co-authored with Paul D'Arcy M.M. In 1967, Kennedy published Fashion Me a People, which won the Catholic Book Award, an award he again won in 1968 for his third book, Comfort My People. During the 1970s, he published twenty-five books, including In the Spirit, In the Flesh (1971), The Return to Man (1973), Believing (1974), Living With Loneliness (1974), On Becoming a Counselor (1977), Sexual Counseling, St. Patrick's Day with Mayor Daley (1976) and Himself (1978), his biography of Mayor Richard Daley of Chicago, which won both the Thomas More Medal for "the most distinguished contribution to Catholic Literature in 1978" as well as the Carl Sandburg Award (1978) for the best non-fiction by a Chicago author.

His On Becoming a Counselor has been described as "an unusually helpful, well-conceived guide" for non-professional counselors – those persons such as teachers, lawyers, ministers, nurses, priests and others – who may have to do counseling as part of their professional work.

During the 1980s, Kennedy co-authored Defendant with his wife, Sara Charles.  He also published three novels: Father's Day (1981), which was awarded the Carl Sandburg Award for the best fiction by a Chicago author in 1980-1981; Queen Bee (1984); and Fixes (1989).  He also wrote a one-man play, I Would Be Called John, based on the life of Pope John XXIII, which became a PBS special featuring Charles Durning.

During the 1990s and into the new century, Kennedy, continued to publish, including a biography of Joseph Cardinal Bernardin,This Man Bernardin (1996),and reflections on his relationship with the Cardinal in My Brother Joseph (1997).  Kennedy also published Authority (with Sara Charles)(1997), The Unhealed Wound (2001), and his last book, Believing (2013), which won a Catholic Book Award First Prize from the Catholic Press Association. At the time of his death, Kennedy was working with Sara Charles on the 4th edition of On Becoming a Counselor.

In addition to publishing a number of books, Kennedy also wrote articles and opinion pieces in numerous publications and newsletters, as well as columns for the Chicago Tribune, Religious News Service and the  National Catholic Reporter's "Bulletins from the Human Side. He was awarded the Wilber Award in 1987 by the Religious Public Relations Council for his New York Times Magazine article, "A Dissenting Voice."

Throughout his career, Kennedy was a frequent TV commentator on politics and religion and lectured widely. His final lecture was given on Maryknoll Alumni Day, celebrating the 100th anniversary of Maryknoll, on September 16, 2011.

Personal 
Kennedy left the priesthood in 1977 and married Sara Charles M.D. They had homes in Chicago and Michigan.

Kennedy died at Lakeland Hospital, St. Joseph, Michigan, of heart failure. His funeral Mass was celebrated in Old St. Patrick's Church in Chicago and he is buried in Resurrection Cemetery in St. Joseph, Michigan.

Works

General non-fiction 

 The Genius of the Apostolate. with Paul F. D'Arcy. New York:  Sheed and Ward, 1965
 Fashion Me a People: Man, Woman and the Church. New York: Sheed and Ward, 1967
 Comfort My People: The Pastoral Presence of the Church. New York: Sheed and Ward, 1968
 The People are the Church. 1969
 A Time for Love.1970
 The Catholic Priest in the United States: psychological investigations, with Víctor J. Heckler. Washington D.C.: United States Catholic Conference, 1972.
 What A Modern Catholic Thinks About Sex. 1971
 In the Spirit, In the Flesh. 1971
 The New Sexuality. 1972
 The Pain of Being Human. 1972
 What A Modern Catholic Thinks About Marriage. 1972
 Living with Loneliness. 1973
 The Heart of Loving. 1973
 Return to Man. 1973
 The Joy of Being Human. 1974
 Believing. 1974
 Living with Everyday Problems. 1974
 A Contemporary Meditation on Prayer. 1975
 If You Real/y Knew Me, Would You Still Like Me? 1975
 A Sense of Life, A Sense of Sin. 1975
 Human Rights and Psychological Research. ed., 1975
 What a Modern Catholic Thinks About Sex and Marriage. 1975
 The Trouble Book. 1976
 St. Patrick's Day with Mayor Daley. 1976
 A Time for Being Human. 1977
 On Becoming a Counselor. 1977
 Sexual Counseling. 1977
 Free To Be Human. 1979
 The Choice to Be Human. 1981
 On Being a Friend. 1982
 Loneliness and Everyday Problems. 1983
 Crisis Counseling. 1984
 Defendant: A Psychiatrist on Trial for Medical Malpractice. (with Sara Charles) 1985
 The Now and Future Church. 1985
 Reimagining American Catholicism: The American Bishops and Their Pastoral Letters. 1985
 The Trouble with Being Human. 1986
 A Time for Being Human. 1987
 Tomorrow's Catholics, Yesterday's Church. 1988
 On Becoming a Counselor - 2nd edition. 1990
 Authority: The Most Misunderstood Idea in America. (with Sara Charles) 1997
 On Becoming a Counselor- 3rd edition. (with Sara Charles) 2001
 The Unhealed Wound: The Church and Human Sexuality. 2001
 Joseph Campbell: Thou Art That: Transforming Religious Metaphor (editor). 2001
 9-11: Meditations at the Center of the World. 2002
 Would You Like to Be a Catholic? 2003
 Blogging Toward Bethlehem. 2007 
 Believing. 2013

Fiction 

 Father's Day. 1981 (Doubleday/Pocket)
 Queen Bee. 1982 (Doubleday) 
 Fixes. 1989 (Doubleday)

Biography 

 Himself. 1978 (Viking)
 Cardinal Bernardin. 1989 
 This Man Bernardin. 1996 
 My Brother Joseph. 1997
 Bernardin: Life to the Full. 1997
 Cardinal Bernardin's Stations of the Cross. 2003

Plays 

  I Would Be Called John. 1986 (PBS)

References

External links

 Eugene Kennedy Quotes
 Maryknoll Alumni Day

American psychology writers
American male non-fiction writers
Loyola University Chicago faculty
1928 births
2015 deaths
American columnists
Maryknoll Seminary alumni
American people of Irish descent
Catholic University of America alumni
Laicized Roman Catholic priests